Wang Kun (born October 20, 1985 in Zhangjiakou, Hebei) is a female Chinese football (soccer) player who competed at the 2004 Summer Olympics.

In 2004, she was a squad member of the Chinese team which finished ninth in the women's tournament.

International goals

External links
profile

1985 births
Living people
Chinese women's footballers
China women's international footballers
Footballers at the 2004 Summer Olympics
Olympic footballers of China
2007 FIFA Women's World Cup players
Sportspeople from Zhangjiakou
Footballers from Hebei
Asian Games medalists in football
Footballers at the 2006 Asian Games
Asian Games bronze medalists for China
Women's association footballers not categorized by position
Medalists at the 2006 Asian Games